Wen I Tzu (born ) is a Taiwanese female volleyball player. 

She participated in the 2012 FIVB Volleyball World Grand Prix.
She was part of the Chinese Taipei women's national volleyball team.

References

External links
 Profile at FIVB.org

1991 births
Living people
Taiwanese women's volleyball players
Place of birth missing (living people)
Volleyball players at the 2010 Asian Games
Volleyball players at the 2014 Asian Games
Asian Games competitors for Chinese Taipei